XHGYM-FM is a noncommercial radio station on 103.7 FM in Guaymas, Sonora, Mexico. It is one of two social stations owned by concessionaire Organiden, A.C.

History
Organiden applied for the permit for XHGYM in 2013. It was not awarded until December 14, 2016, and it took the station another year to come to air, signing on in January 2018. It operated as Voz Sonora, a noncommercial station under Radiovisa management, for slightly over a year.

In February 2019, XHGYM went silent. It returned on August 2, 2019, as grupera station La Más Chingona, operated by Grupo Larsa Comunicaciones. Larsa controlled no commercial radio stations in Guaymas. On November 10, 2019, XHGYM and XHHER-FM in Hermosillo changed from La Más Chingona to Toño, the company's adult hits format.

XHGYM went silent in October 2021, by which time it was just one of three stations programmed by Larsa.

References

Radio stations in Sonora
2018 establishments in Mexico
Radio stations established in 2018